The Women's 3000 metres event at the 2021 European Athletics Indoor Championships was held on 4th of March, 2021 at 19:30 (heats), and on 5th of March, 2019 at 21:00 (final) local time.

Medalists

Records

Results

Heats
Qualification: First 4 in each heat (Q) and the next 4 fastest (q) advance to the Final.

Final

References

2021 European Athletics Indoor Championships
3000 metres at the European Athletics Indoor Championships
European